4 Wheeled Restaurant is a South Korean reality cooking show. The show presents various Korean chefs cooking in the country their cuisine originated from. The aim is to open a food truck and see if their cooking is accepted in the origin country as if it was in Korea.

Season 1 was aired on Tuesdays on tvN from 27 March 2018 at 11 p.m. (KST) as chefs traveled to cities in Thailand and the season ended on 15 May 2018.

Season 2 was aired on Saturdays on tvN from 8 September 2018 at 6 p.m. (KST) as new chefs traveled to cities in China. The season ended on 17 November 2018.

Season 3 was aired on Thursdays on tvN from 18 April 2019 at 11 p.m. (KST) as another new team of chefs traveled to cities in the United States. The season ended on 4 July 2019.

Season 4 was aired on Tuesdays on tvN from 19 May 2020 at 10:30 p.m. (KST) as a completely new crew of chefs take part in the domestic spin-off version of the show, Will They Eat When Delivered (배달해서 먹힐까). The season ended on 21 July 2020.

Concept
The first-season cast members are restaurateur and television personality Hong Seok-cheon, boy band Shinhwa's Lee Min-woo and actor Yeo Jin-goo. Seok-cheon, an owner of a number of Thai restaurants, along with the other two members operated a Thai food truck in cities in Thailand. Their aim is to see if the Thai people would eat Seok-cheon's version of Thai food.

The second-season cast members are Korean-Chinese cuisine chef Lee Yeon-bok, actors Kim Kang-woo and Seo Eun-soo, and comedian Heo Kyung-hwan. They operated a Chinese food truck all around China.

The third-season cast members are boy band Shinhwa's Eric Mun and Lee Min-woo, singer John Park with Korean-Chinese cuisine chef Lee Yeon-bok and comedian Heo Kyung-hwan. Jung Joon-young was initially cast for the filming in Los Angeles and Shinhwa's Lee Min-woo was being cast for filming in San Francisco. However, due to Jung Joon-young's involvement in the Burning Sun scandal, the production team decided to completely remove all of Jung Joon-young's footage.

The fourth season, a domestic spin-off of the show named Will They Eat When Delivered (배달해서 먹힐까), stars Italian cuisine chef Sam Kim, television personality Ahn Jung-hwan, and singers Yoon Doo-joon of Highlight and Jeong Se-woon. They operated a kitchen in South Korea (Yeonnam-dong, Mapo-gu, Seoul) and make Italian food, and they are only available for delivery through ordering with food delivery applications or calling in to the kitchen to order. The cast members' identities are unknown to the customers, except for the hints appearing on the packages of the food.

Airtime

Cast

Season 1 (Thailand)

Season 2 (China)

Season 3 (U.S.A.)

Season 4 - Spin-off (South Korea)

Ratings
 Note that the show airs on a cable channel (pay TV), which plays part in its slower uptake and relatively small audience share when compared to programs broadcast (FTA) on public networks such as KBS, SBS, MBC or EBS.

Season 1

Season 2

Season 3

Season 4

References

External links
 
 

2020s South Korean television series
2018 South Korean television series debuts
TVN (South Korean TV channel) original programming
South Korean variety television shows
South Korean reality television series
Korean-language television shows
South Korean cooking television series